European science programme may refer to:
 Science and technology in Europe
 Framework Programmes for Research and Technological Development of the European Union, including their current (2021-2027) 9th iteration, the   Horizon Europe
 European Innovation Council
 European Institute of Innovation and Technology
 European Research Area (ERA)
 European Research Council (ERC)
 European Research Executive Agency
 Erasmus+
 European Space Agency Science Programme